Chengdu Museum (aka Chengdu Museum New Hall from 2016) is a large city museum in Chengdu, Sichuan, China.

The museum is located on the west side of Tianfu Square, close to the Jincheng Art Palace, Sichuan Art Museum, Sichuan Provincial Library, and Sichuan Science and Technology Museum.

History
On 15 September 1958, the Chengdu Municipal Government, under the direction of the Ministry of Culture to prepare for the formation of a museum, established the Chengdu Topographical Museum Preparatory Committee, located at Daci Temple. The deputy mayor, the writer Li Jieren, was the director of the committee. The committee eventually led to the opening of Chengdu Museum in 1984, housed at Daci Temple.

In 2007, the architects Sutherland Hussey Harris, together with Pan­solution, based in Beijing, won the first prize in an international competition to design a new city museum for Chengdu. The museum building was completed in 2016 with a floor area of 65,000 m2 and named Chengdu Museum New Hall.

Collections

The museum has six floors displaying historic artifacts. It has exhibitions of puppetry, shadow puppets, and wood carvings. The museum is the largest comprehensive museum in Chengdu with nearly 200,000 objects in its collections, covering a time period from the Neolithic period to that of the Republic of China.

See also
 Chengdu Museum of Contemporary Art

References

External links

 Museum website 

1984 establishments in China
Museums established in 1984
Buildings and structures completed in 2016
Museums in Chengdu
City museums in China
Puppet museums